CYGM may refer to:
 Gimli Industrial Park Airport in Gimli, Manitoba, Canada (ICAO airport code)
 CYGM filter (cyan, yellow, green, magenta) to produce colour images on some charge-coupled devices